Djobo Atcho (born 30 January 1988) is an Ivorian footballer who plays as a forward.

International career

International goals
Scores and results list Ivory Coast's goal tally first.

References

External links 
 

1988 births
Living people
Ivorian footballers
Ivory Coast international footballers
Association football forwards
Ivory Coast A' international footballers
2016 African Nations Championship players